Firdousi Begum is an Indian politician. In 2011, 2016 and 2021, she was elected as MLA of Sonarpur Uttar Vidhan Sabha constituency in West Bengal Legislative Assembly.

Firdousi Begum ( Born 2 February 1975 ) is an Indian politician of
All India Trinamool Congress [AITC]. She is now parliamentary
secretary of the department of panchayats and rural development since
3 January 2014.

She joined All India Trinamool Congress as a lady Councillor of
Rajpur-Sonarpur Municipality on June, 2004.

She was vice-chairperson of Rajpur-Sonarpur Municipality since 2009 to 2013.

She is also the first lady Member of Legislative Assembly since May,
2011 of Sonarpur Constituency.

She is also Member of District planning committee of south 24 parganas
and member of standing committee of privileges and finance excise,
development and planning.

 She is from All India Trinamool Congress.

References

Living people
Trinamool Congress politicians from West Bengal
Women in West Bengal politics
West Bengal MLAs 2011–2016
West Bengal MLAs 2016–2021
Year of birth missing (living people)
21st-century Indian women politicians